Reynoutria japonica, synonyms Fallopia japonica and Polygonum cuspidatum, is a species of herbaceous perennial plant in the knotweed and buckwheat family Polygonaceae. Common names include Japanese knotweed and Asian knotweed. It is native to East Asia in Japan, China and Korea. In North America and Europe, the species has successfully established itself in numerous habitats, and is classified as a pest and invasive species in several countries.

Japanese knotweed has hollow stems with distinct raised nodes that give it the appearance of bamboo, though it is not related. While stems may reach a maximum height of  each growing season, it is typical to see much smaller plants in places where they sprout through cracks in the pavement or are repeatedly cut down.

Related species include giant knotweed (Reynoutria sachalinensis, syns. Fallopia sachalinensis, Polygonum sachalinense) and Russian vine (Fallopia baldschuanica, syn. Polygonum baldschuanicum).

Names
Common names for Japanese knotweed include fleeceflower, Himalayan fleece vine, billyweed, monkeyweed, monkey fungus, elephant ears, pea shooters, donkey rhubarb, American bamboo, and Mexican bamboo, among many others, depending on country and location. The kanji expression is from the Chinese meaning 'tiger stick'. One interpretation of the Japanese name is that it comes from 'remove pain' (alluding to its painkilling use), though there are other etymological explanations offered.

Identification
Identification of Japanese knotweed is not always easy. Many other plants are suspected of being knotweed, due often to the similar appearance of leaves and stems. Dogwood, lilac, houttuynia (Houttuynia cordata), ornamental bistorts such as red bistort (Persicaria amplexicaulis), lesser knotweed (Koenigia campanulata), Himalayan balsam (Impatiens glandulifera), broad-leaved dock (Rumex obtusifolius), bindweed (Convolvulus arvensis), bamboo, Himalayan honeysuckle (Leycesteria formosa), and Russian vine (Fallopia baldschuanica) have been suspected of being Reynoutria japonica.

Mature R.japonica forms , dense thickets. The stems look somewhat like bamboo, with rings and purple speckles. Leaves shoot from the stem nodes alternately in a zigzag pattern. Mature, healthy stems are hollow and not woody. Plants that are immature or affected by mowing and other restrictions have much thinner and shorter stems than mature stands, and are not hollow.

Uses 

Japanese knotweed flowers are valued by some beekeepers as an important source of nectar for honeybees, at a time of year when little else is flowering. Japanese knotweed yields a monofloral honey, usually called bamboo honey by northeastern U.S. beekeepers, like a mild-flavoured version of buckwheat honey (a related plant also in the Polygonaceae).

The young stems are edible as a spring vegetable, with a flavour similar to rhubarb. In some locations, semi-cultivating Japanese knotweed for food has been used as a means of controlling knotweed populations that invade sensitive wetland areas and drive out the native vegetation. It is eaten in Japan as sansai or wild foraged vegetable.

It is used in traditional Chinese and Japanese medicine to treat various disorders through the actions of resveratrol, although there is no high-quality evidence from clinical research for any medical efficacy. Extracts of resveratrol from R. japonica roots are higher in content than those from stems or leaves, and have highest levels at the end of the growing season.

Ground-feeding songbirds and gamebirds also eat the seeds.

In Japan
It grows widely throughout Japan and is foraged as a wild edible vegetable (sansai), though not in sufficient quantities to be included in statistics. They are called by such regional names as tonkiba (Yamagata), itazuiko (Nagano, Mie), itazura (Gifu, Toyama, Nara, Wakayama, Kagawa), gonpachi (Shizuoka, Nara, Mie, Wakayama), sashi (Akita, Yamagata), jajappo (Shimane, Tottori, Okayama), sukanpo (many areas).

Young leaves and shoots, which look like asparagus, are used. They are extremely sour; the fibrous outer skin must be peeled, soaked in water for half a day raw or after parboiling, before being cooked.

Places in Shikoku such as central parts of Kagawa Prefecture pickle the peeled young shoots by weighting them down in salt mixed with 10% nigari (magnesium chloride). People in Kochi also rub these cleaned shoots with coarse salt-nigari blend. It is said (though no authority is cited) that the magnesium of the nigari binds with the oxalic acid thus mitigating its hazard.

Invasive species
This species is listed by the World Conservation Union as one of the world's worst invasive species.

It is a frequent colonizer of temperate riparian ecosystems, roadsides, and waste places. It forms thick, dense colonies that completely crowd out any other herbaceous species and is now considered one of the worst invasive exotics in parts of the eastern United States. The success of the species has been partially attributed to its tolerance of a very wide range of conditions; including drought, different soil types, variable soil pH, and high salinity. The plant is also resilient to cutting, vigorously resprouting from the roots.

Impact
The invasive root system and strong growth can damage concrete foundations, buildings, flood defences, roads, paving, retaining walls and architectural sites. It can also reduce the capacity of channels in flood defences to carry water.

Japanese knotweed shades out other vegetation, grows over buildings and other structures, encourages fire, and damages paved surfaces.

Control 
Japanese knotweed has a large underground network of roots (rhizomes). To eradicate the plant the roots need to be killed. All above-ground portions of the plant need to be controlled repeatedly for several years in order to weaken and kill the entire patch. Picking the right herbicide is essential, as it must travel through the plant and into the root system below. But also more ecologically-friendly means are being tested as an alternative to chemical treatments.

Chemical

The abundance of the plant can be significantly reduced by applying glyphosate, imazapyr, a combination of both, or by cutting all visible stalks and filling the stems with glyphosate. However, these methods have not been proven to provide reliable long-term results in completely eliminating the treated population.

Mechanical
Digging up the rhizomes is a common solution where the land is to be developed, as this is quicker than the use of herbicides, but safe disposal of the plant material without spreading it is difficult; knotweed is classed as controlled waste in the UK, and disposal is regulated by law. Digging up the roots is also very labour-intensive and not always effective.

Covering the affected patch of ground with a non-translucent material can be an effective follow-up strategy. However, the trimmed stems of the plant can be razor sharp and are able to pierce through most materials. Covering with non-flexible materials such as concrete slabs has to be done meticulously and without leaving even the smallest splits. The slightest opening can be enough for the plant to grow back.

Soil steam sterilization involves injecting steam into contaminated soil in order to kill subterranean plant parts.

Trials in Haida Gwaii, British Columbia, using sea water sprayed on the foliage, have not demonstrated promising results.

Biological
Research has been carried out on a Mycosphaerella leaf spot fungus, which devastates knotweed in its native Japan. This research has been relatively slow due to the complex life cycle of the fungus.

Following earlier studies, imported Japanese knotweed psyllid insects Aphalara itadori, whose only food source is Japanese knotweed, were released at a number of sites in Britain in a study running from 1 April 2010 to 31 March 2014. In 2012, results suggested that establishment and population growth were likely, after the insects overwintered successfully. In 2020 Amsterdam imported and released 5,000 Japanese Aphalara itadori leaf fleas, exempting them from a strict ban on the introduction of alien species, as one of the measures to contain the knotweed. The psyllids suck up sap from the plant, potentially killing young shoots and slowing or even stopping growth. It was hoped that the psyllid would hibernate over winter and establish themselves in 2021.

Anecdotal reports of effective control describe the use of goats to eat the plant parts above ground followed by the use of pigs to root out and eat the underground parts of the plant.

Impact of the plant outside its area of origin

New Zealand

Japanese knotweed is classed as an unwanted organism in New Zealand and is established in some parts of the country.

Europe
European adventurer Philipp Franz von Siebold transported Japanese knotweed from a Japanese volcano to Leiden in the Netherlands. By 1850, a specimen from this plant was donated by Von Siebold to the Royal Botanic Gardens, Kew. It was favoured by gardeners because it looked like bamboo and grew everywhere. Ann Conolly provided the first authoritative work on the history and distribution of the plant in the UK and Europe in the 1970s. According to The Daily Telegraph, the weed has travelled rapidly, aided by rail and water networks. In the UK, Japanese knotweed is a single female clone. However, it is able to readily hybridise with related species.

In the UK, Japanese knotweed is established in the wild in many parts of the country and creates problems due to the impact on biodiversity, flooding management and damage to property. It is an offence under section 14(2) of the Wildlife and Countryside Act 1981 to "plant or otherwise cause to grow in the wild" any plant listed in Schedule nine, Part II to the Act, which includes Japanese knotweed. As of 2014, householders and landlords within towns, who do not control the plant in their gardens, can receive an on-the-spot fine or be prosecuted. It is also classed as "controlled waste" in Britain under part 2 of the Environmental Protection Act 1990. This requires disposal at licensed landfill sites.

Some home owners in the United Kingdom are unable to sell their homes if there is any evidence of knotweed on the property. The species is expensive to remove. According to the UK government, the cost of controlling knotweed had hit £1.25 billion in 2014. It cost £70 million to eradicate knotweed from 10 acres of the London 2012 Olympic Games velodrome and aquatic centre. Defra's Review of Non-native Species Policy states that a national eradication programme would be prohibitively expensive at £1.56 billion. The Centre for Ecology and Hydrology has been using citizen science to develop a system that gives a knotweed risk rating throughout Britain.

The decision was taken on 9 March 2010 in the UK to release into the wild a Japanese psyllid insect, Aphalara itadori. Its diet is highly specific to Japanese knotweed and shows good potential for its control. Controlled release trials began in South Wales in 2016.

In Scotland, the Wildlife and Natural Environment (Scotland) Act 2011 came into force in July 2012 that superseded the Wildlife and Countryside Act 1981. This act states that is an offence to spread intentionally or unintentionally Japanese knotweed (or other non-native invasive species).

In Northern Ireland it has been recorded from Counties Down, Antrim and Londonderry. The earliest record is in 1872.

In the Republic of Ireland, it has been recorded from Howth Head, Co. Dublin at Doldrum Bay.

Lending controversy 
In the United Kingdom, Japanese knotweed has received a lot of attention in the press as a result of very restrictive lending policies by banks and other mortgage companies. Several lenders have refused mortgage applications on the basis of the plant being discovered in the garden or neighbouring gardens. The Royal Institution of Chartered Surveyors published a report in 2012 in response to lenders refusing to lend "despite [knotweed] being treatable and rarely causing severe damage to the property".

In response to this guidance, several lenders have relaxed their criteria in relation to discovery of the plant. As recently as 2012, the policy at the Woolwich (part of Barclays plc) was "if Japanese knotweed is found on or near the property then a case will be declined due to the invasive nature of the plant." Their criteria have since been relaxed to a category-based system depending on whether the plant is discovered on a neighbouring property (categories 1 and 2) or the property itself (categories 3 and 4) incorporating proximity to the property curtilage and the main buildings. Even in a worst-case scenario (category 4), where the plant is "within 7 metres (23 feet) of the main building, habitable spaces, conservatory and/or garage and any permanent outbuilding, either within the curtilage of the property or on neighbouring land; and/or is causing serious damage to permanent outbuildings, associated structures, drains, paths, boundary walls and fences" Woolwich lending criteria now specify that this property may be acceptable if "remedial treatment by a Property Care Association (PCA) registered firm has been satisfactorily completed. Treatment must be covered by a minimum 10-year insurance-backed guarantee, which is property specific and transferable to subsequent owners and any mortgagee in possession." Santander have relaxed their attitude in a similar fashion.
 In 2022 the Royal Institution of Chartered Surveyors produced updated guidance for assessing knotweed. Since the 2012 RICS report much more information on the risks from Japanese knotweed have been gained. One important change is that the distance of a plant from a property to be considered a problem has been reduced to 3 metres (10 feet).

Property Care Association chief executive Steve Hodgson, whose trade body has set up a task force to deal with the issue, said: "Japanese knotweed is not 'house cancer' and could be dealt with in the same way qualified contractors dealt with faulty wiring or damp."

United States

The weed can be found in 42 of the 50 United States.

Canada
According to Gail Wallin, executive director of the Invasive Species Council of B.C., and co-chair of the Canadian Council on Invasive Species, by 2015 it was found in all provinces in Canada except Manitoba and Saskatchewan. In Vancouver plants went under "four lanes of highway and have popped up on the other side." At Mission Point Park in Davis Bay, British Columbia, municipal crews attempted to eradicate it by digging out the plant to a depth of about three metres (10 feet) with an excavator. It grew back twice as large the next year. To avoid an epidemic as in the United Kingdom, some provinces in Canada are pushing for relaxation of provincial limits on the use of herbicides close to waterways so knotweed can be aggressively managed with strong chemicals. In spite of its status as an invasive species it is still sometimes sold or swapped in Canada as an edible "false bamboo". Bohemian knotweed, a hybrid between Japanese and giant knotweed that produces huge quantities of viable seeds, now accounts for about 80 per cent of knotweed infestations in British Columbia.

See also
 Persicaria capitata for another plant species called Japanese knotweed.
Chinese knotweed

References

External links

 Photo of herbarium specimen at Missouri Botanical Garden, collected in Missouri in 1994
 Species Profile - Japanese knotweed (Fallopia japonica), National Invasive Species Information Center, United States National Agricultural Library. Lists general information and resources for Japanese knotweed.
 Best management practice A variety of ways to control knotweed (under "knotweed")(US)
 Strategies for the eradication of Japanese knotweed
 American Journal of Botany - Sexual Reproduction in the Invasive Species Fallopia japonica
 Japanese Knotweed Alliance (UK)
 Recipes from "Wildman" Steve Brill
 Time lapse video of knotweed growth BBC
 Insect that fights Japanese knotweed to be released BBC News 2010-03-09
 How close is Japanese Knotweed to my home? BBC News 11 August 2017
 UK location map at planttracker.org.uk
 
 The alien shrub that can't be stopped – BBC Future

Flora of Eastern Asia
Garden plants of Asia
Medicinal plants
Polygonoideae
Stem vegetables
Plants described in 1777
Flora of China